Arsène Zola Kiaku (born 23 February 1996) is a Congolese professional footballer who plays for TP Mazembe, as a left back.

Club career
After playing for TP Mazembe, in July 2019 it was announced that he would move to Belgian club Anderlecht, alongside teammate Meschak Elia. By August 2019 both players were noticed to be missing from Anderlecht's training camp, and it was later revealed that both players had failed to complete their transfers to Anderlecht and were looking for different clubs.

International career
In May 2018, he was called up to the Democratic Congo national team for a friendly with Nigeria, and was named to the matchday line-up as an unused substitute.

Zola represented the DR Congo at under-23 level. The country was disqualified from the Under-23 Africa Cup of Nations qualifiers in April 2019 after it was revealed that Zola was ineligible to play as he was too old, with the country changing his birthdate from 1996 to 1997.

He made his debut for DR Congo national football team on 29 March 2021 in an AFCON 2021 qualifier against Gambia.

References

External links

1996 births
Living people
Democratic Republic of the Congo footballers
Democratic Republic of the Congo international footballers
TP Mazembe players
Association football fullbacks
21st-century Democratic Republic of the Congo people